The following is a list of events effecting Philippine television in 1993. Events listed include television show debuts, finales, cancellations, and channel launches, closures and rebrandings, as well as information about controversies and carriage disputes.

Event
 October - ABS-CBN celebrated its 40th anniversary of Philippine television.
 October 31 - Radio Mindanao Network's became the second radio-based network to launch a TV network called Cinema Television Channel 31 (CTV-31) through its flagship station, DWKC-TV. The country's first ever modern UHF television station, begins broadcasts.

Premieres

Unknown date
 January: Action 9 on New Vision 9

Unknown
 Bistromania on RJTV 29
 Vina on ABC 5
 We R Family on ABC 5
 Tondominium on ABC 5
 Mysteries 2000 on ABC 5
 Nap Knock on ABC 5
 Action Theater on ABC 5
 Movies to Watch on ABC 5
 Mag-Agri Tayo on PTV-4
 Bioman on IBC 13
 Candy Crush on ABS-CBN
 Dance Upon a Time with Becky Garcia on RJTV 29
 GMA Telesine Specials on GMA 7

Programs transferring networks

Finales
 March 19: Lunch Date on GMA
 October 10: Gwapings on GMA
 December 3: Kape at Balita on GMA

Unknown
 Daimos on GMA
 Mag-Asawa'y Di Biro on New Vision 9
 Quantum Leap on ABC 5
 PTV Weekend Report on PTV-4
 Tinig Bayan on PTV-4
 T.O.D.A.S. Again on IBC-13

Channels

Launches
 October 31: CTV 31 (now BEAM TV)

Unknown dates
 May: RJTV 29

Births
 January 4 – Marlo Mortel, actor and singer
 January 17 – Ken Chan, actor and singer
 January 20 – Meg Imperial, actress
 January 25 – Kylie Padilla, Filipino-Australian actress and singer
 February 11 – Marlann Flores, actress
 February 12 – Shey Bustamante, actress
 February 17 – AJ Perez, actor (d. 2011)
 February 19 – Empress Schuck, actress
 April 13 – Juancho Trivino, actor
 April 16 – Ann B. Mateo, actress and commercial model
 April 17 – Lauren Reid, actress and commercial model
 April 24 - Pocholo Bismonte, actor and singer
 May 4 - Joyce Pring, radio and television host
 May 11 – James Reid, actor and singer
 May 20 – Devon Seron, actress
 September 29 – Teejay Marquez, actor
 October 9 –
 Sarah Lahbati, actress
 Jhoana Marie Tan, actress
 October 12 – Carl John Barrameda, actor
 October 16 - Jovit Baldivino, singer, actor (d. 2022)
 October 31 – Nadine Lustre, singer, actress
 November 4 – Moira Dela Torre, singer
 November 7 - Hiro Peralta, actor
 November 8 – Lauren Young, Filipino-American actress
 November 12 – EJ Jallorina, actor
 November 26 – Fretzie Bercede, actress
 December 8 – Yamyam Gucong

See also
1993 in television

 
Television in the Philippines by year
Philippine television-related lists